The 2019 La Tropicale Amissa Bongo was a road cycling stage race that took place in Gabon and Equatorial Guinea between 21 and 27 January 2019. The race was rated as a 2.1 event as part of the 2019 UCI Africa Tour, and was the 14th edition of the race.

Teams
Fifteen teams started the race. Each team had a maximum of six riders:

Route

Stages

Stage 1

Stage 2

Stage 3

Stage 4

Stage 5

Stage 6

Stage 7

Classifications

Classification leadership table

References

External links

2019
2019 UCI Africa Tour
2019 in Gabonese sport